The Coupe de France 1997–98 was its 81st edition. It was won by Paris SG.

The cup winner qualified for UEFA Cup.

Round of 16

Quarter-finals

Semi-finals

Final

Topscorer
Sylvain Wiltord (4 goals)

References

French federation
1997–98 Coupe de France at ScoreShelf.com

1997–98 domestic association football cups
1997–98 in French football
1997-98